Hugh Morrison Wales (6 May 1910 – 12 April 1995) was a Scottish footballer who played as a right half.

Career
Born in Kilwinning, Wales played club football for Motherwell, (winning the Scottish Football League title in 1931–32 and playing in three Scottish Cup finals) and made one appearance for Scotland in 1933. He also guested during World War II for a number of teams, including Charlton Athletic, Chelsea and Luton Town. He later played for Elgin City. During the War he served with the Royal Artillery and was selected for the Army's football team.

He later emigrated to Canada.

His father and elder brother, both named Abraham Wales and inside forwards by position, were also footballers, although not as successful as Hugh.

References

1910 births
1995 deaths
Scottish footballers
Scotland international footballers
Motherwell F.C. players
Charlton Athletic F.C. wartime guest players
Chelsea F.C. wartime guest players
Luton Town F.C. wartime guest players
Elgin City F.C. players
Association football wing halves
People from Kilwinning
Scottish emigrants to Canada
Kilwinning Rangers F.C. players
Footballers from North Ayrshire
British Army personnel of World War II
Royal Artillery soldiers